The 1986 United States Senate election in Kansas was held on November 4, 1986. Incumbent Republican Bob Dole defeated Democratic nominee Guy MacDonald with 70.05% of the vote.

Primary elections
Primary elections were held on August 5, 1986.

Democratic primary

Candidates
Guy MacDonald, school teacher
Darrell Ringer
W.H. Addington
Lionel Kunst
Jim Oyler

Results

Republican primary

Candidates
Bob Dole, incumbent United States Senator
Shirley J.A. Landis

Results

General election

Candidates
Bob Dole, Republican
Guy MacDonald, Democratic

Results

See also
 1986 United States Senate elections

References

1986
Kansas
United States Senate
Bob Dole